Serial Lover is a 1998 film directed by James Huth.

Plot
Claire Doste is about to reach the age of 35 and has everything one dreams of, such as having four boyfriends and a creative job in a publishing house specialising in crime novels. One day, she invites all of her boyfriends to her birthday dinner so that she can pick out her would-be fiancé. But an accident happens when Claire is getting the dinner ready.

Cast
Michèle Laroque – Claire Doste
Albert Dupontel – Eric Cellier
Elise Tielrooy – Alice Doste
Michel Vuillermoz – Charles Thiriot
Marina Foïs – Mina Schuster
Isabelle Nanty – Isabelle
Zinedine Soualem – Prince Hakim
Jean-Paul Rouve – Edouard 'Douad' Pied
Elise Larnicol – Hakim's girlfriend

References

External links

1998 films
1990s black comedy films
French black comedy films
1990s French-language films
Films directed by James Huth
1998 comedy films
Films scored by Bruno Coulais
1990s French films